The Council of Benevento may mean one of a number of Councils, or more accurately in some cases synods, of the Roman Catholic Church.

Synod of Benevento (1087): Pope Victor III condemned lay investiture.
Council of Benevento (1091): Pope Urban II held councils at Melfi (1089), Benevento and Troia (1093).
Synod of Benevento (1108), Synod of Benevento (1113), Synod of Benevento (1117): Pope Paschal II
1331
1513

Notes

Catholic Church councils held in Italy
11th-century Catholic Church councils
12th-century Catholic Church councils
14th-century Catholic Church councils
16th-century Catholic Church councils